Marea may refer to:
 Marea (ancient city), Egypt
 Mare' or Marea, a town in Syria
 Marea (band), a Spanish hard rock band
 Marea (restaurant), New York City
 Marea Stamper (born 1977), American singer, songwriter, DJ, and record producer, known professionally as the Blessed Madonna
 Lake Mariout, Egypt, once called Marea

Other uses
 Fiat Marea
 MAREA, a transatlantic communications cable

See also
 Marea (We've Lost Dancing), a 2021 song by Fred Again and the Blessed Madonna
 Maria (disambiguation)
 Mare, a female horse